Saperda kojimai is a species of beetle in the family Cerambycidae. It was described by Hiroshi Makihara and Nakamura in 1985. It is known from Taiwan.

References

kojimai
Beetles described in 1985